Linda Burnham (born 1948) is an American journalist, activist, and leader in women's rights movements, particularly with organizations and projects serving and advocating for women of color.

Early life and family
Burnham was born in 1948, to parents who were active in the Young Communist League, and then the Southern Negro Youth Congress, in the 1930s and 1940s. Her father was Louis E. Burnham, an activist and journalist. She grew up in Brooklyn, New York, and graduated from Reed College in 1968.

Career
As a journalist and political activist, Burnham has been a leader and member with the Venceremos Brigade, the Third World Women's Alliance, the Alliance Against Women's Oppression, the Angela Davis Defense Committee, and the Line of March.

She co-founded the Women of Color Resource Center in Oakland, California in 1990 and served as its Executive Director for eighteen years. Burnham is currently the National Research Director for the National Domestic Workers Alliance.

Burnham led women of color delegations to the 1985 UN World Conference on Women in Nairobi, the 1995 UN World Conference on Women in Beijing, China, and the 2001 United Nations World Conference Against Racism in Durban, South Africa.

Burnham is featured in the 2014 feminist history film She's Beautiful When She's Angry.

Awards
She was nominated in 2005 as one of the 1000 Peace Women for the Nobel Prize and was the 2007-8 Twink Frey Visiting Social Activist at the Center for the Education of Women, University of Michigan.

Publications
 Burnham, L., & Wing, B. (1981). Toward a communist analysis of Black oppression and Black liberation. Place of publication not identified: publisher not identified.
Burnham, L. (March 1, 1985). Has Poverty Been Feminized in Black America?. The Black Scholar, 16, 2, 14-24.
Burnham, L., & Gustafson, K. (2000). Working hard, staying poor: Women and children in the wake of welfare "reform". Berkeley, CA: Women of Color Center.
Burnham, L. (January 1, 2001). Welfare reform, family hardship, and women of color. Annals of the American Academy of Political and Social Science, 38-48.
Burnham, L. (2001). The wellspring of Black feminist theory. Oakland, CA: Women of Color Resource Center.
Burnham, L. (2002). Racism in U.S. welfare policy: A human rights issue. Oakland, CA: Women of Color Resource Center.
Burnham, L. (December 1, 2008). Obama's Candidacy: The Advent of Post-Racial America and the End of Black Politics?. The Black Scholar, 38, 4, 43-46.
Burnham, L., Theodore, N., & Ehrenreich, B. (2012). Home economics: The invisible and unregulated world of domestic work. New York: National Domestic Workers Alliance
 “Lean in and One Percent Feminism.” Portside, March 26 (2013).

References

External links 
 Linda Burnham papers at the Sophia Smith Collection, Smith College Special Collections
 Linda Burnham oral history, interviewed by Loretta Ross
"1% Feminism", by Linda Burnham

1948 births
Living people
Reed College alumni
20th-century American journalists
21st-century American journalists
American women journalists
American feminist writers
African-American activists
20th-century African-American women
20th-century African-American people
21st-century American women
21st-century African-American women
21st-century African-American people